Inhumanoids is the title of an animated series and the name of a Hasbro toy property that were both released in 1986. In the tradition of other Hasbro properties such as Transformers, and G.I. Joe, the show was produced by Sunbow Entertainment and Marvel Productions and animated in Japan by Toei Animation. Inhumanoids tells the story of the scientist-superhero group, Earth Corps, as they battle a trio of subterranean monsters called the Inhumanoids with the aid of elemental beings, the Mutores.

Inhumanoids: The Movie
The Inhumanoids series did not begin as a conventional 22-minute cartoon, but rather as a slate of six-to-seven-minute shorts that aired as part of the collective Super Sunday half-hour block alongside other Marvel/Sunbow series, Jem and the Holograms, Bigfoot and the Muscle Machines and Robotix. Although Bigfoot had only nine episodes, the other shows ran to 15 episodes, telling a complete story across their numerous installments, which were later edited together to form "movies" that were released on video. Out of the four, Jem proved to be the most popular, and was eventually made into an ongoing series that lasted for 65 episodes.

Summary
The story begins with the discovery of a monstrous creature encased in an amber monolith buried in Big Sur national park, that is recovered by Earth Corps, a government-funded geological sciences research team. The finding spurs Blackthorne Shore, a corrupt industrialist, to clandestinely uncover and release a second monster buried elsewhere—a giant vine-like creature called Tendril, who attacks the amber block's public unveiling in San Francisco to release the macabre colossus trapped within, D'Compose. They rampage through city streets before fleeing into the watery darkness of the bay.

The Earth Corps member code-named Liquidator returns to Big Sur in search of further clues to the origin of these monsters, whereupon he discovers a race of sentient tree-beings, the Redwoods, who explain that they are part of a race of subterranean creatures known as Mutores and that their kind sealed the evil Inhumanoids Tendril and D'Compose beneath the Earth ages ago. The malevolent Inhumanoid leader, Metlar, remains imprisoned below the surface, paralyzed by the magnetic field of a Mutore duo named Magnokor.

A nocturnal assault by Tendril demolishes the Earth Corps base, prompting a chase into the depths of the Earth, but even with the help of another Mutore species, the rock-bodied Granites, they are forced to retreat to the surface. When their budget is summarily cut by Senator Masterson, a crooked politician in Blackthorne Shore's shady pocket, they are approached by Sandra Shore, Blackthorne's sister, who has learned of her brother's sinister plot to liberate Metlar. Funded by Sandra, the team constructs new vehicles and embarks back below the Earth's surface, tracking D'Compose and Tendril to the city of the Granites, where an ensuing battle frees Metlar from Magnokor's hold. Having pilfered the Earth Corps's engineering schematics via his ties to Masterson, Blackthorne joins the fray, now equipped with his own battle suit whose magnetic powers he wields against Metlar, only to be derailed by Tendril's interference while Sandra falls victim to the mutative touch of D'Compose.

Earth Corps manages to escape and forms an alliance with the Granites. Herc accompanies them to D'Compose's domain of Skellweb while Auger and Liquidator venture into Metlar's kingdom of Infernac and Bright convinces the Redwoods to help defend the surface world against attempts by the Inhumanoids to acquire sources of power. Herc and the Granites are able to defeat D'Compose's reanimated soldiers and restore Sandra to normal. Blackthorne pursues Auger and Liquidator to Infernac and tries to use his magnetic powers on Metlar once again but is foiled by Magnokor and taken captive by Metlar.

Acting on information forced from Blackthorne, the Inhumanoids raid a Soviet airbase, stealing a handful of nuclear missiles. A seemingly repentant Blackthorne warns Earth Corps that the missiles are intended to shatter the divide between the Earth's crust and mantle, but upon traveling into the Earth to preclude this catastrophe, the team discovers that Blackthorne has set them up and that the missiles are actually meant to detonate the planet's core. Earth Corps is able to convince D'Compose to allow them access to Infernac — a deal made easier by the fact that the Inhumanoid already fears for his survival in the face of Metlar's insane plan — and they manage to defuse enough of the missiles to thwart the explosive scheme.

Following a climactic battle, D'Compose is re-sealed in amber casing, and Tendril is imprisoned by the Granites. Finally, Magnokor succeeds in neutralizing Metlar even as Blackthorne is arrested by Earth Corps. Senator Masterson provides the Earth Corps team with a new headquarters facility, but a tissue sample secured from Tendril during their first encounter with the monster has mysteriously gone missing.

The series
Inhumanoids and Jem surpassed their fellow "Super Sunday" offerings by going on to be expanded into independent full-length shows. Jem achieved the greater success, eventually running to 65 episodes spanning several seasons, while Inhumanoids lasted only one season. In both cases, to begin the series, the introductory "movies" were cut into five separate 22-minute episodes composed of three shorts apiece. Inhumanoids was thereafter given the series subtitle, The Evil That Lies Within, a phrase which was included in the lyrics of the opening credits of the show in every episode. A further eight 22-minute episodes were then produced to yield the standard thirteen-episode TV season.

The series proved unusual among children's cartoons of its time by the strong narrative flow that linked episodes in sequence with continuing storylines and suspenseful threading of subplots. Visually, the show was distinctive for its application of heavy shadow, use of split screens, and sometimes brow-raising for its gory content, such as monstrous amputations or writhing deaths by toxic waste, which would be hard-pressed to sneak their way into contemporary "children's hour" programming.

Episodes

Characters

The Earth Corps
 Dr. Herman "Herc" Armstrong, codename 'Hooker', is the leader of Earth Corps, decisive and outspoken. His exosuit sports a powerful grappling hook mounted in an arm gauntlet, which he uses to scale vertical extremes in his spelunking adventures. He was voiced by Neil Ross.
 Dr. Derek Ericson Bright, codename 'Digger', is the maverick engineer responsible for designing Earth Corps' vehicles and other high-tech equipment.
 Dr. Edward "The Fist" Augutter, codename 'Auger', is the bald member of the team, a distinguished archaeologist and Earth Corps' resident mechanic, constructing the team's protective exosuits and weaponry.
 Mr. Marcus Capello, codename 'Captain Action', is a master Policeman. He was voiced by John Aniston.
 Dr. Johnathon Martin Slattery, codename 'Liquidator', is a master chemist. He was voiced by William Callaway.
 Sandra Shore, codename 'Ms. Navigator', the only female Earth Corps member. She was voiced by Susan Silo.
 Colonel Anatoly Kiev, codename 'Tankmaster' is a veteran member of the Soviet army and world-famous chess master. He was also voiced by Neil Ross.
 Bradley Joseph Armbruster, codename 'Sabre Jet', is a pilot in the U.S. Air Force.

Cast
 Charles Adler - George Landisburg ("Primal Passions")
 Michael Bell - Auger, Blackthorne Shore
 William Callaway - Jonathan M. Slattery/Liquidator, Nightcrawler/Dr. Herman Manglar (from "Cypheroid" to "Cult of Darkness")
 Fred Collins - General Kursakov
 Brad Crandel - Narrator
 Ron Feinberg - Nightcrawler (from "Negative Polarity" onwards)
 Dick Gautier - Magnakor/Pyre/Crygen, Senator Masterson ("Cypheroid"), George Landisburg ("The Masterson Team" and "Auger... For President?")
 Ed Gilbert - Metlar, Senator Masterson
 Chris Latta - D'Compose, Tendril, Granahue
 Neil Ross - Herc Armstrong, Tank, Ssslither, Sabre Jet, Hector Ramirez
 Richard Sanders - Derek Bright
 Stanley Ralph Ross - Redlen, Redsun, Joe Abdullah
 Susan Silo - Sandra Shore, Stella Blaze, Statue of Liberty, Female Statue Warriors, Barbara Walker
 John Stephenson - Granok, General Granitary
 John Aniston – Mr. Marcus Capello, Captain Action
 Stephen Nichols – Willie Grapers, Piranhatron
 Mary Beth Evans – Eliza Masterson, Moleculer
 James Reynolds - Spiderdragon
 Philip L. Clarke - Dirty Beggar, Witch Insecticides

Action figures
A series of action figures based on the cartoon was produced by Hasbro and designed by David McDonald (now VP of Product Development/Design at Spin Master LTD) in 1986. The scientist figures each had an action power and all figures had "glow in the light" features. Metlar, Tendril, and D'Compose were 14" figures and are the most sought after.

The original series of Mutors had a variety of toy figures: Redlen (dark redwood), Redsun (light redwood), Redwood Race (grey redwood), Granok (grey granite), and Granite Race (beige granite).

A second series of Inhumanoids figures was in the works at the time of the line's cancellation. The only character confirmed to reach the prototype stage by an ex-Hasbro employee was Sslither (although the animated designs of Tank, Sabre Jet, Nightcrawler, and Blackthorne's second suit all strongly indicate that they were based on intended toys).

Comic book

Marvel Comics (1987)
Marvel Comics produced a short-lived Inhumanoids comic book under its Star Comics imprint in 1987, adapting the storyline of "The Evil That Lies Within". The series ended after only 4 issues and left readers with the cliffhanger of Metlar's escape from captivity and Sandra Shore's transformation into an undead minion of D'Compose. Within the Marvel Comics multiverse, the Inhumanoids reality is designated as Earth-87119.

2009 cancelled series
In 2009, Kevin Smith was rumored to be writing a reboot for the Inhumanoids comic series, with George Pratt doing art. In 2010, Smith said via Facebook that he was not penning a script for Inhumanoids, but told that "it was a killer series back in the day, [it's] a shame it didn't last longer, had some really gruesome shit that I wouldn't mind tackling someday". Nothing has been mentioned since after his statement.

IDW Publishing (2020)
The 2020 miniseries Rom: Dire Wraiths by IDW Publishing set in the Hasbro Comic Book Universe features characters and references to Inhumanoids; for example, the Earth Corps are renamed as the Adventure-One Team.

References

External links
 
 
 

1980s American animated television series
1980s American science fiction television series
1980s toys
1986 American television series debuts
1986 American television series endings
American children's animated action television series
American children's animated adventure television series
American children's animated science fiction television series
American children's animated superhero television series
American children's animated horror television series
Animated television series about extraterrestrial life
Comics based on Hasbro toys
English-language television shows
Fictional giants
First-run syndicated television programs in the United States
Kaiju
Science fiction comics
Star Comics titles
Super Sunday (TV series)
Superhero comics
Television series by Hasbro Studios
Television series by Marvel Productions
Television series by Sunbow Entertainment
Television series created by Flint Dille
Television shows adapted into comics
Television series by Claster Television
Anime-influenced Western animated television series